IR$ is a Franco-Belgian comics series written by Stephen Desberg, illustrated by Bernard Vrancken and published by Le Lombard in French and Cinebook in English.

Story

Larry B. Max is one of the few specialists in a special department of the Internal Revenue Service (IRS), an American tax collection agency. Reading the circuits of escape and laundering of money like no other person, Larry has all the computer resources necessary to demonstrate the links between the very rich and organized crime. One of the most difficult cases he's come up to deals with a wealthy American Jew known for his involvement in the recovery of property confiscated by Nazis. Examining accounts of this billionaire, Larry begins a dangerous ascent to the mysterious origins of his own large fortune...

Albums

La voie fiscale 04/1999
La stratégie Hagen 04/2000
Blue ice 05/2001
Narcocratie 05/2002
Silicia Inc. 05/2003 
Le corrupteur 04/2004
Corporate America 05/2005 	
La guerre noire 05/2006
Liaisons romaines 05/2007
La loge des assassins 05/2008 	
Le chemin de Gloria 06/2009
Au Nom du Président 06/2010
L'or de  Yamashita
Les Survivants de Nankin

Translations

Since April 2008, Cinebook has been publishing I.R$. in English. Four albums have been released so far:

Taxing Trails (includes The Hagen Strategy), April 2008, 
Blue Ice (includes Narcocracy), January 2009, 
Silicia Inc., January 2010, 
The Corrupter, April 2010,

References

Lombard Editions titles
Belgian comic strips
Bandes dessinées
Action comics
Drama comics
Belgian graphic novels
Fictional businesspeople
Thriller comics
1999 comics debuts
Internal Revenue Service